Osceola School District may refer to:

 Osceola School District (Arkansas), based in Osceola, Arkansas
 Osceola School District (Missouri), based in Osceola, Missouri
 Osceola School District (Wisconsin), based in Osceola, Wisconsin
 Osceola Public Schools, based in Osceola, Nebraska
 School District of Osceola County, Florida, based in Osceola County, Florida
 Mecosta–Osceola Intermediate School District, based in Big Rapids, Michigan
 Philipsburg-Osceola Area School District, based in Pennsylvania